The women's K-2 500 metres event was a pairs kayaking event conducted as part of the Canoeing at the 1988 Summer Olympics program.

Medalists

Results

Heats
15 crews entered in two heats on September 26. The top three finishers from each of the heats advanced directly to the semifinals while the remaining nine teams were relegated to the repechages.

Repechages
Two repechages took place on September 26. The top three finishers from each repechage advanced directly to the semifinals.

Semifinals
The top three finishers in each semifinal (raced on September 28) advanced to the final.

Final
The final was held on September 30.

References
1988 Summer Olympics official report Volume 2, Part 2. pp. 348–9. 
Sports-reference.com 1988 women's K-2 500 m results.

Women's K-2 500
Olympic
Women's events at the 1988 Summer Olympics